Ida Betty Odinga (born Ida Anyango Oyoo on 24 August 1950) is a Kenyan businesswoman, activist and educator. She is the wife of Raila Odinga, the former Prime Minister of Kenya, and the leader of National Super Alliance (NASA). In 2010, The Standard named Odinga, who was one of the first women to head a major Kenyan company, as one of the top most powerful women in Kenya in 2010.

Early life and education
Odinga earned a Bachelor of Arts from the University of Nairobi in 1973 when she was 24 years old. While attending the University of Nairobi, she met her future husband, Raila Odinga, who was an employee of the university's Department of Engineering at the time. The couple married on 1 September 1973 and have four children. One of their children, Fidel Odinga, died in 2015.

Career
She worked as a teacher for more than twenty years after graduation. She taught at Kenya High School, an all-girls public school located near Nairobi. Her students included the late Governor of Bomet County, Joyce Laboso.

Raila Odinga was imprisoned in 1982 as a political prisoner by the government of President Daniel arap Moi. Ida Odinga largely raised her children herself during those years while working as a teacher. However, Ida Odinga was later expelled from her teaching position by the Kenya African National Union-led government due to Raila Odinga's political opposition.

Odinga founded the League of Kenya Women Voters in 1991, which promotes opportunities for women in the political arena. She served as the chairperson of the League. She has also championed a host of other causes, many focused on women, children and health in Kenya. Odinga has advocated for the prevention of breast cancer and fistulas, and eradication of the chigoe flea. She has also mentored Kenyan schoolgirls and sat on the board of directors for an organization which aids paraplegics.

She became the managing director of the East African Spectre, a liquified gas cylinder manufacturing company, in 2003, becoming one of the first women to head a major Kenyan company.

The Standard listed Odinga as one of the top most powerful women in Kenya in 2010.

In a 2012 interview with CNN International, Odinga elaborated on her life as a politician's wife. She told CNN's Felicia Taylor, "It's good to be a wife, but it's good to be an educated wife. Being a wife, it's just not a position of subordination – it's a position of strength."

In November 2018, Odinga endorsed Bill 2018, which would amend the Constitution of Kenya to guarantee the nomination of female candidates and MPs to  Parliament. While she publicly supported the bill, which she said would increase leadership posts for women MPs, Odinga also noted that women had never had the opportunity to compete equally with male politicians in politics. Odinga appeared in Parliament to support sitting women MPs during the debate. However, the bill failed to pass in the National Assembly in February 2019, despite vocal support from Ida Odinga, President Uhuru Kenyatta, and other prominent politicians and activists.

In 2019 Odinga emphasized that she would not endorse anybody for 2022 election and people are free to choose anyone they want.

In June 2020, Ida's husband, former prime minister, traveled to United Arab Emirates for hospital treatment.

Controversy

Regulation of churches 
Earlier this year, Ida Odinga called for the regulation of churches to tame the unchecked mushrooming of worship centers across the country. She said the National Council of Churches of Kenya (NCCK) should also ensure church leaders are taken through training for quality service to the congregants. This sparked a heated debate on the internet forcing her to withdraw and apologize because the remarks made didn't sit well with some members of the clergy. She also stated that her remarks were blown out of context. Ida, had, however, received backing from the Atheists Society in Kenya which demanded that churches not run by theologians should be abolished.

References

1950 births
Living people
Spouses of prime ministers of Kenya
Kenyan educators
Kenyan chief executives
Kenyan women business executives
21st-century Kenyan businesswomen
21st-century Kenyan businesspeople
Kenyan women's rights activists
Orange Democratic Movement politicians
University of Nairobi alumni
Kenyan Luo people